Vohilava is a town and commune in Madagascar. It belongs to the district of Nosy Varika, which is a part of Vatovavy-Fitovinany Region.

It is situated at the RN 11 between Nosy Varika and Mananjary.

The population of the commune was estimated to be approximately 15,000 in 2001 commune census.

Only primary schooling is available. The majority 98% of the population of the commune are farmers.  The most important crop is rice, while other important products are coffee and cassava. Services provide employment for 2% of the population.

References and notes 

Populated places in Vatovavy-Fitovinany